Whitson is a surname. Notable people with the surname include:

Beth Slater Whitson (1879–1930), American lyricist
Ed Whitson (born 1955), American baseball player
Frank Whitson (1877–1946), American film actor
John Whitson (1558–1629), English merchant and politician
Keith Whitson (born 1943), British banker
Peggy Whitson (born 1960), American biochemist and astronaut
Sam Whitson, American politician
Tony Whitson (1885–1945), South African soccer player